Anchors & Ampersands is the seventh album by Canadian music artist Marker Starling (Chris A. Cummings), released in 2017. It is a collection of original material, with two cover versions – "I'll Be Around", & "Double Suicide" by Sandro Perri.

With songs written that span more than half his life, Cummings' seventh album has been called a "reflection on mortality", & a "mellow & tender" record with elements of soul, Brazilian & classic 70's soft-rock genres, as well as influence by Robert Wyatt.

Track listing

Side 1
 Conundrum Redux
 No More Partylights
 Strong Suit
 Playin' Along '99
 Double Suicide

Side 2
 I'll Be Around
 Shadows & Counterparts
 Lost Look II
 Blue Strike The Hours
 Comes A Daybreak II

Personnel
Produced & mixed, vocals & guitar by Zack G
Recorded at Rooster Studios & Buenos Bandidos Sound
Mastered by João Carvalho at João Carvalho Mastering
Artwork & Design by Sharmila Banerjee
Chris A. Cummings – Writing & arrangement, vocals, Fender Rhodes, Wurlitzer, RMI Electra Piano, Lowrey MicroGenie, Roland RS-09, percussion
Jay Anderson, Drums
B.J. Cole, Pedal steel guitar
Robin Dunn, Vocals
Ryan Driver, Vocals & flute
Thom Gill, Backing vocals
Ben Gunning, Backing vocals
Domenico Lancellotti, Percussion
Matt McLaren, Bass guitar, guitar
Alex Samaras, Backing vocals
Jeremy Strachan, Tenor saxophone, Alto saxophone & Soprano saxophone
Felicity Williams, Backing vocals

References

External links
AllMusic review
Tin Angel Marker Starling webpage
Anchors & Ampersands Tin Angel Records webpage
Playin' Along `99 Official Video

2017 albums